The 1996 United States presidential election in Maine took place on November 5, 1996, as part of the 1996 United States presidential election. Maine is one of two states in the U.S. that chooses two of its four representatives  in the Electoral College based on the plurality vote in both its congressional districts instead of all four electors being chosen based on the statewide plurality vote.

Maine confirmed its status as a blue state, with Democratic nominee President Bill Clinton carrying the state with 51.62% of the vote over Republican Bob Dole, who received 30.76%. As of 2020, Clinton's 20.86% margin of victory is the widest for a Democrat since Lyndon B. Johnson in 1964, although several subsequent Democrats have won a higher vote percentage.

Maine has voted Democratic since 1992, and is the only state other than Nebraska to split its electoral votes. The last time Maine went Republican was for George H. W. Bush and Dan Quayle in 1988. Third Party candidate Ross Perot had a lesser impact this time, only drawing 14% of the vote, compared to 30% in 1992. This would still be where Perot received the highest percentage of votes in 1996. , this is the last election in which Piscataquis County voted for a Democratic presidential candidate. This is also the most recent election in which all the counties of Maine voted for the same party.

Results

Results by county

Counties that flipped from Independent to Democratic
Piscataquis (Largest city: Dover-Foxcroft)
Somerset (Largest city: Skowhegan)
Waldo (Largest city: Belfast)

See also
 United States presidential elections in Maine
 Presidency of Bill Clinton

References

Maine
1996
1996 Maine elections